The 1932 Richmond-upon-Thames by-election was held on 13 April 1932.  The by-election was held due to the resignation of the incumbent Conservative MP, Newton Moore.  It was won by the Conservative candidate William Ray.

References

Richmond-upon-Thames by-election
Richmond-upon-Thames,1932
Richmond-upon-Thames,1932
Richmond-upon-Thames by-election
Richmond-upon-Thames by-election
Richmond-upon-Thames,1932
20th century in Surrey
Unopposed by-elections to the Parliament of the United Kingdom (need citation)